This is a list of German television related events from 1975.

Events
3 February - Joy Fleming is selected to represent Germany at the 1975 Eurovision Song Contest with her song "Ein Lied kann eine Brücke sein". She is selected to be the twentieth German Eurovision entry during Ein Lied für Stockholm held at the HR Studios in Frankfurt.

Debuts

ARD
23 January – Man kann auch anders leben (1975)
28 March –  (1975)
29 March – Nonstop Nonsens (1975–1980)
4 April – Dein gutes Recht (1975)
15 April – Schnickschnack (1975–1977)
18 May – PS (1975–1979)
 3 July – Autoverleih Pistulla (1975)
16 July – Kommissariat IX (1975–1979)
9 August – Floris von Rosemund (1975)
4 September – Die schöne Marianne (1975)
24 September – Eurogang (1975–1976)
8 November –  (1975)
29 November – Unsere Penny (1975–1976)
16 December – Eine ganz gewöhnliche Geschichte (1975–1976)

ZDF
1 January – Musik ist Trumpf (1975–1981)
6 March –  (1975)
14 April – John Ralling - Abenteuer um Diamanten (1975)
1 May – Tadellöser & Wolff (1975)
12 June – Beschlossen und verkündet (1975)
4 August – Der schwarze Doktor (1975)
11 September – Berlin - 0:00 bis 24:00 (1975)
17 September – keine Polizei (1975)
11 December – Spannagl & Sohn (1975–1976)
19 December –  (1975)
21 December –  (1975)

Television shows

1950s
Tagesschau (1952–present)

1960s
 heute (1963-present)

Ending this year

Births
1 October - Fabian Busch, actor Der Kriminalist)
date unknown - Christoph Bach, actor (The Heavy Water War)

Deaths
4 December - Albert Bessler, 70, actor (Derrick)